Soza may refer to:

 Suza, Iran, the capital of Shahab District in Qeshm County, Hormozgan Province, Iran
 Slovak Performing Rights Society (Slovenský ochranný zväz autorský pre práva k hudobným dielam, SOZA), a state-authorized collecting society and performance rights organisation for musical works in Slovakia